Larry Cook may refer to:

Larry Cook (artist), American conceptual, video, and photo artist
Larry the Cook, a character in Seinfeld
Larry Cook, a character in A Thousand Acres
Larry Cook, actor in Trouble Man
Larry Cook, anti-vaccination activist and founder of Stop Mandatory Vaccination

See also
Lawrence Cook (disambiguation)